F. Murray Abraham is an American actor known for his role in film, television and theatre.

Abraham received the Academy Award for Best Actor for his portrayal of Antonio Salieri in the 1984 drama film Amadeus, a performance that also earned him a BAFTA Award nomination and a Golden Globe Award win. He was nominated for a Critics' Choice Movie Award and a Screen Actors Guild Award for the comedy-drama film The Grand Budapest Hotel (2014).

His television roles include Dar Adal in the Showtime series Homeland (2012–18), for which he was nominated for two Primetime Emmy Awards for Outstanding Guest Actor in a Drama Series, and Bert Di Grasso on the second season of the HBO anthology series The White Lotus (2022), that earned him a Golden Globe Award nomination for Best Supporting Actor.

His work on the stage has earned him two Obie Awards and three nominations at the Drama Desk Awards. He has also been nominated for a Grammy Award.

Major associations

Academy Awards

British Academy Film Awards

Critics' Choice Movie Awards

Golden Globe Awards

Grammy Awards

Primetime Emmy Awards

Screen Actors Guild Awards

Theatre awards

Drama Desk Awards

Obie Awards

Critics awards

Notes

References

External links 
  

Lists of awards received by American actor